Spiller is a German surname meaning player of a musical instrument. It may refer to: 

Bill Spiller, American golfer
Bill W. Spiller, American broadcaster
Billy Spiller, English cricket and rugby player
C. J. Spiller, American football player
Carlton T. Spiller, American poet
Cecil Spiller, Welsh cricketer
Charlie Spiller, American football player
 Cristiano Spiller, Italian DJ
Danny Spiller, English football player
Frederick Spiller, English boxer
Gustav Spiller, Hungarian-English writer
Henry Spiller, English politician
Isaiah Spiller (born 2001), American football player
Letícia Spiller, Brazilian actress
Ljerko Spiller, Croatian violinist
Mary Spiller (1924–2019), English horticulturist
Michael Spiller, American director
Matthew Spiller, Canadian hockey player
Richard Georg Spiller von Hauenschild or Max Waldau, Polish poet and novelist
Robert Spiller, English politician
Teo Spiller, Slovenian artist

Fictional
Lucy Spiller, a character from the American TV series Dirt
Patrick Spiller, a character from the British TV series Casualty

See also
Spiller, Ohio, an unincorporated community
Spillers (disambiguation)